Peter Proudfoot (28 October 1879 – 4 March 1941) was a Scottish footballer who scored 21 goals in 162 appearances in the Football League playing for Lincoln City, Clapton Orient, Chelsea and Stockport County. He played at inside right, centre half or right half. He also played in the Southern League for Millwall and briefly for Scottish Football League clubs St Mirren, Albion Rovers and Morton. When he signed for Millwall in 1904, the Daily Express described him as "a big strapping fellow with a fine knowledge of the game". He was the first player to be transferred directly from Chelsea to Manchester United.

Proudfoot was manager of Clapton Orient in three spells covering much of the 1920s and 1930s. In 1928, the Football Association suspended him from football for six months for financial irregularities.

Personal life
Proudfoot served in the Lanarkshire Yeomanry and Royal Scots Fusiliers and as a lieutenant in the Labour Corps during the First World War. He was mentioned in despatches on 16 January 1918.

References

1879 births
1941 deaths
Sportspeople from Wishaw
Scottish footballers
Association football wing halves
Lincoln City F.C. players
St Mirren F.C. players
Wishaw F.C. players
Albion Rovers F.C. players
Millwall F.C. players
Leyton Orient F.C. players
Chelsea F.C. players
Manchester United F.C. players
Stockport County F.C. players
Greenock Morton F.C. players
English Football League players
Southern Football League players
Scottish football managers
Leyton Orient F.C. managers
British Army personnel of World War I
Lanarkshire Yeomanry soldiers
Royal Scots Fusiliers soldiers
Royal Pioneer Corps officers
Footballers from North Lanarkshire